Wayan Palmieri (born January 31, 1977) is an American music video director, film editor and photographer.

Career

Feature and short films

As the Stereoscopic Supervisor and CTO of Digital Revolution Studios, Wayan assisted in the creation of the 3D post production workflow with Craig Tanner.

Work

Filmography

Awards and nominations
 2011, Telly Award for 'Best Use of 3D' in the TV series "Bullproof"
 2012, Telly Award for 'Best Use of 3D' in the Commercial' – Army Strong
 2012, Telly Award for 'Best Use of 3D' in the Music Video' – Foster The People "Don't Stop"
 2017: Telly Award for 'Best Online Music Video' – Bambaata Marley "Waiting for the War"
 2017: Telly Award for 'Directing' – Bambaata Marley "Waiting for the War"
 2018: Telly Award for 'Best Online Music Video' – Bambaata Marley "Unconditional"

References

External links
 

American music video directors
Living people
People from Bali
1977 births
American film editors